The 1950/51 NTFL season was the 30th season of the Northern Territory Football League (NTFL).

Buffaloes have won there 11th premiership title while defeating the Waratah in the grand final by 18 points.

Grand Final

References 

Northern Territory Football League seasons
NTFL